Socialist Youth Alliance (in Portuguese: Aliança Socialista da Juventude) was a leftist youth movement  in Portugal linked to the Workers Revolutionary Party (PRT). ASJ existed around 1974–1975.

Youth wings of political parties in Portugal